The 1891 Rutgers Queensmen football team represented Rutgers University as an independent during the 1891 college football season. In their first and only season under head coach William Ayres Reynolds, the Queensmen compiled an 8–6 record and outscored their opponents, 265 to 137. The team's captain was Philip Milledoler Brett, who later served as Rutgers University president.

Schedule

References

Rutgers
Rutgers Scarlet Knights football seasons
Rutgers Queensmen football